David Edward Reichle (born October 19, 1938) is an American ecologist who worked at the Oak Ridge National Laboratory (ORNL) and is known for his pioneering research on the movement of radionuclides in the environment and the carbon metabolism of forest ecosystems. From 1967 to 1981 he was co-chair of Woodlands for the International Biological Programme. He served as Director of ORNL’s Environmental Sciences Division (1986-1990) and retired in 2000 as Associate Director of the Oak Ridge National Laboratory. His advanced text, The Global Carbon Cycle and Climate Change: scaling ecological energetics from the organism to the biosphere was published in 2020.

Biography 
Born October 19, 1938 to Elsie and Edward J. Reichle in Cincinnati, Ohio. He bonded with the environment as a youth, freely roaming the steep, wooded hillsides of Fairview Heights overlooking downtown Cincinnati. As president of his senior class, he graduated summa cum laude, with a B.S. in biology and chemistry, from Muskingum University, OH, in 1960. He attended Northwestern University on a Danforth Foundation Fellowship, where he received his M.S. and Ph.D. degrees in biological sciences in 1961 and 1964. He was a lecturer in ecology (1964) at the Chicago Academy of Sciences.  His doctoral thesis was on The Distribution and Abundance of Bog-inhabiting Pselaphid beetles. A U.S. Atomic Energy Commission postdoctoral fellowship led to a life-long professional career at the Oak Ridge National Laboratory.

Marriage and children 
Reichle and Donna Rae Haubrich, whom he had met as a graduate student at Northwestern University, married after she completed her M.S. in 1961 in her home town, Kenosha, Wisconsin. She helped David with the field work for his thesis and taught anatomy and physiology at the  Evanston (Illinois) Hospital School of Nursing, until their son, John Landon, was born (b 1963). After moving to Oak Ridge, TN, two daughters followed: Deborah Lynn (b. 1965) and Jennifer Lee (b. 1966). All three graduated from Wake Forest University: John, MD Univ. TN; Deborah, JD Vanderbilt Univ.; and Jennifer, CPA. When the children entered high school, Donna re-entered the workforce with Science Applications, Inc., as coordinator of volunteers at the Oak Ridge Museum of Science and Energy, and then as a technical editor (1985-1995) in the Information Division of the Oak Ridge National Laboratory.

Professional career 
Recognizing that his training in biogeography and ecophysiology at Northwestern University left him underprepared for research in the emerging field of modern ecology, Reichle applied for an Atomic Energy Commission postdoctoral fellowship to obtain advanced experimental training. Reichle arrived at Oak Ridge National Laboratory (ORNL) in Tennessee as an Atomic Energy Commission Postdoctoral Fellow in 1964, and joined the staff of the Radiation Ecology Section of the Health Physics Division as a biophysicist in 1966. In 1970 he became Program Manager for Ecosystems Studies, in the Environmental Sciences Division. During the early 1980s, he managed the Global Carbon Cycle Research Program for the Department of Energy (DOE), which was the lead US federal agency for research on atmospheric carbon dioxide, including extramural carbon cycle R&D support of seminal research by Robert F. Keeling, Hans Oeschger, Wm. Schleisinger and Wally Broecker, among others. He led ORNL's Climate Change Program until becoming Director of ORNL’s Environmental Sciences Division (1986–1990), until he was appointed ORNL Associate Director for Life and Environmental Sciences (1990-2000) and Vice-President of Lockheed-Martin Energy Systems. He was an Adjunct Professor of Ecology at The University of Tennessee from 1969 until his retirement in 2000.

Professional and civic organizations  
Reichle served on the review panel of the National Science Foundation's (NSF) Ecology Program (1970-1972), on the NSF's Research Advisory Council for Applied Science and Research Applications (1973-1975) and on the Scientific Advisor Board of the National Academy of Sciences' (NAS) Environmental Studies Board (1974-1976), and the NAS Board on Environmental Sciences and Toxicology (1976-1977).  He served on the Advisory Board of the Electric Power Research Institute (1971-1972), the Research Advisory Council of the Gas Research Institute (1995-1997), the Board of Visitors of Indiana University's School of Public and Environmental Affairs (1993-1997), and the Advisory Board of the South Carolina Universities Research and Education Foundation (1992-1994).  He served as Vice Chair (2000-2002) of the Southern Appalachian Man and the Biosphere Program.  He was a member of the Ecological Society of America (ESA), chairing its Applied Ecology Section (1973-1975), serving on the ESA Governing Council (1974-1976), and Public Affairs Committee (1982-1984), and was nominated as a candidate for the ESA presidency in 1984; Fellow of the American Association for the Advancement of Science; member of the American Institute of Biological Sciences; the Health Physics Society; Sigma Xi; INTECOL; and the Soil Zoology Section of the International Society of Soil Science.  He was a consulting editor for Springer Verlag (1974-1979).  His civic service included President of the Board of Directors of the Boys and Girls Club (B&GC) of Oak Ridge, TN (1974-2003), chair of the B&GC Tennessee Area Council (1988-1991), and recipient of the national B&GC Silver Service Medallion (2001); co-chair with Donna of the 2003-2004 United Way campaign for Roane County, TN; president of the Friends of Oak Ridge National Laboratory (2001-2002); president of the Coalition of Oak Ridge Retired Employees (2005-2009); president of the Oak Ridge, TN, Rotary Club (1989-1990); and charter member of the Roane County, TN, Environmental Review Board (1989-2017).

Work

Ecosystem research 
Reichle’s early research focused on the pathways of movement of radionuclides in the environment, studying invertebrate food chains and mineral cycles in forest ecosystems. One of his primary research sites was the Cesium-137 tagged Liriodendron forest in Oak Ridge, TN. He soon realized that radioisotope transport was influenced by the metabolism of species and ecosystems, and he soon became captivated with understanding the carbon metabolism of ecosystems. He began studying the bioenergetics of forest decomposer and herbivore trophic levels with pioneering analyses of the energetics of natural populations and whole ecosystems. Reichle established ORNL’s internationally-renowned ecosystem analysis program in the 1970s. Beginning in the 1980s, he played a major role in the development of Oak Ridge National Laboratory’s climate change research program and the Department of Energy’s research program on the global carbon cycle. 

Reichle has authored over 100 scientific publications and several books in the areas of the environmental behavior of radionuclides, forest ecology, and energy fluxes and carbon cycling in ecosystems. His books include: Analysis of Temperate Forest Ecosystems (1970), Productivity of World Ecosystems (1975), Dynamic Properties of Forest Ecosystems (1981), the Changing Carbon Cycle (1986), and The Global Carbon Cycle and Climate Change (2020). He was a US delegate to UNESCO meetings on Productivity of Forest Ecosystems in Brussels (1969), Delhi (1971), Lund (1976); the 1999 Symposium on the History of Radioecology in Vienna (1999); and the Greenhouse Gas Technology Conference in Cairns, Australia (2000).

Legacy 
His research team’s seminal publication in 1973 on carbon flow and storage in a forest ecosystem along with H.T. Odum’s Silver Springs (1957) and G. M. Woodwell’s Oak-Pine forest (1970), became a benchmark for productivity and energy flow in ecosystems. Reichle played a prominent role in the International Biological Program, which paved the way for emergence of ecosystem research in the US and was the basis for much of the science and future national programs[11] on carbon cycling and climate change effects. He was a participant in the United Nations Framework Convention on Climate Change’s 1992 Earth Summit in Rio de Janeiro, Brazil. Dr. Reichle’s 2020 book The Global Carbon Cycle and Climate Change[2] is a comprehensive state-of-the-art summary of the global carbon cycle and its relationship to climate change, scaling ecological energetics from the organism to the biosphere.

Reichle represented the U.S. at a joint American/Russian symposium sponsored by the International Institute on Applied Systems Analysis on the History of the Atomic Projects: The 50s Years: Sociopolitical, Environmental, and Engineering Lessons Learned with a review of Radioecological research programs of the Atomic Energy Commission in the 1950s.  Reichle has represented the U.S. government as a technical advisor to the 1995 US Trade Mission to South Africa. led by the US Secretary of Energy Hazel O’Leary, and at the 2000 international Greenhouse Gas Technology Conference in Cairns, Australia.

Environmental conservation 
Reichle joined The Nature Conservancy (TNC) in 1961 as a graduate student while at Northwestern University. He served six years on the TNC National Board of Governors (1982-1988), and for 12 years as a Trustee and chairman (2004-2006) of The Nature Conservancy of TN. During his leadership the Conservancy secured protection for 10,000 acres adjoining the Great Smoky Mountains National Park and two designated Wilderness Areas – Citico Creek Wilderness Area and Joyce Kilmer Memorial Forest. During his term as Chairman of the Trustees, the TN Nature Conservancy successfully completed its first state-wide capital campaign. As chairman, he led the Trustees in completing the Walls of Jericho acquisition in the Southern Cumberland Mts., and Pogue Creek and Skinner Mt. in the Northern Cumberland Mts. The TN Nature Conservancy also partnered with the State of Tennessee in a major conservation effort in the Northern Cumberland Mountains, which then TN Gov. Phil Bredesen celebrated in 2007 as the state's largest conservation of land in more than seven decades, with the land along the northern Cumberland Plateau in Anderson, Campbell, Morgan and Scott counties amounting to more than 127,000 acres.

Awards and recognition 
Reichle is a Fellow of the American Association for the Advancement of Science (1968) and received a number of awards including a Danforth Foundation Fellowship (1960), the IUFRO Scientific Achievement Award (1976),  U.S. Department of Energy Distinguished Service Award (2000), and the Muskingum University Distinguished Service Award (1996).

Published works 
1970 Analysis of Temperate Forest Ecosystems, Springer Verlag 

1981 Dynamic Properties of Forest Ecosystems, Cambridge Univ. Press, 

1986 The Changing Carbon Cycle, with J. R. Trabalka, Springer Verlag, 

2020 The Global Carbon Cycle and Climate Change, Elsevier,

Reports, a selection 
1975 Productivity of World Ecosystems, with J. F. Franklin and D. W. Goodall, US National Academy of Sciences,
http://nap.edu/20114

1997 Technology Opportunities to Reduce Greenhouse Gas Emissions, Ed. with S. R. Bull, National Laboratory Directors, 

1999 Carbon Sequestration R&D Plan, Ed., with J. Houghton, B. Kane, and J. Ekmann, Office of Science, US Department of Energy,

Articles, a selection 
 
 
 
 
 
 
 Edwards, N. T., H. H. Shugart, S. B. McLaughlin, W. F. Harris and D. E. Reichle. 1981. Carbon metabolism in terrestrial ecosystems, pp. 499-536. In: Dynamic properties of forest ecosystems, D. E. Reichle (Ed.). Cambridge University Press.

References 

1938 births
Living people
American ecologists
Scientists from Cincinnati
20th-century American scientists
21st-century American scientists
Muskingum University alumni
Northwestern University alumni
Oak Ridge National Laboratory people
Fellows of the American Association for the Advancement of Science